The Third Amendment of the Constitution of India, officially known as The Constitution (Third Amendment) Act, 1954, re-enacted entry 33 of the Concurrent List in the Seventh Schedule of the Constitution with relation to include trade and commerce in, and the production, supply and distribution of 4 classes of essential commodities, foodstuffs, including edible oil seeds and oils; cattle fodder, including oilcakes and other concentrates; raw cotton whether ginned or unginned, and cotton seeds; and raw jute.

Text

The full text of entry 33 of the Concurrent List, prior to the 3rd Amendment is given below:

Proposal and enactment
The bill of The Constitution (Third Amendment) Act, 1954 was introduced in the Lok Sabha on 6 September 1954, as the Constitution (Third Amendment) Bill, 1954 (Bill No. 40 of 1954). It was introduced by T. T. Krishnamachari, then Minister of Commerce and Industry. The bill sought to the Seventh Schedule of the Constitution, substituting a new entry for the original entry 33 of List III (Concurrent List). The full text of the Statement of Objects and Reasons appended to the bill is given below:

A motion to refer the bill to a Joint Committee was moved by the Lok Sabha on 10 September and adopted on 13 September. The motion was concurred by the Rajya Sabha on 16 September 1954. The Joint Committee presented its Report to the Lok Sabha on 20 September. The Rajya Sabha passed the bill on 28 September 1954. The bill, after ratification by the States, received assent from then President Rajendra Prasad on 22 February 1955. It was notified in The Gazette of India, and also came into force on the same date.

Ratification
The Bill was passed in accordance with the provisions of Article 368 of the Constitution, and was ratified by the Legislatures of more than one-half of the States specified in Parts A and B of the First Schedule by resolutions to that effect passed by those Legislatures before the Bill making provision for such amendment is presented to the President for assent, as required by the said article. State Legislatures that ratified the amendment are listed below:

 Rajasthan
 Punjab
 Patiala and East Punjab States Union
 Saurashtra
 Madhya Pradesh
 Madras
 Bihar
 West Bengal

See also
List of amendments of the Constitution of India

References

03
1954 in India
1954 in law
Nehru administration